"No Type" is a hip hop song by American hip hop duo Rae Sremmurd. It was released on September 15, 2014, by EarDrummers Entertainment and Interscope Records, as the second single from their debut studio album SremmLife (2015). The song was produced by Mike Will Made It with additional production from Swae Lee. The song has peaked at number 16 on the US Billboard Hot 100 chart, becoming their second highest-charting single behind "Black Beatles".

Music video
The music video was directed by Max and released on August 11, 2014. As of September 2020, it has received  800 million views on YouTube.

In other media 
The song is used in the television series Black-ish and the film American Honey.

Personnel
Credits adapted from SremmLife album booklet.

Song credits

Writing – Aaquil Brown, Khalif Brown, Michael Williams II
Production – Mike Will Made It
Co-production – Swae Lee
Recording – P-Nazty and Marz at Ear Druma Studios in Atlanta, Georgia
Audio mixing – Stephen Hybicki and Mike Will Made It at Ear Druma Studios in Atlanta, Georgia
Mastering – Dave Kutch, The Mastering Palace, New York City

Commercial performance
The song has been certified 5× Platinum by the Recording Industry Association of America (RIAA). "No Type" was chosen as the American Rap Single of the Year by readers on the most opinion-forming rap website in Poland – Hip-hop.pl.

Charts

Year-end charts

Certifications

References

External links 
 

2014 singles
2014 songs
Rae Sremmurd songs
Songs written by Swae Lee
Interscope Records singles
Song recordings produced by Mike Will Made It
Songs written by Mike Will Made It
Songs written by Slim Jxmmi
Trap music songs